The Droid Mini is an Android-based, 4G LTE-capable smartphone designed by Motorola as the successor to the Droid Razr M. It is a smaller version of the Droid Ultra. It uses an LCD instead of the AMOLED display that the Droid Maxx and Droid Ultra use. However, it maintains the same features, chipset, CPU and GPU.

History 
The Droid Mini was announced on 23 July 2013 at a joint Motorola and Verizon Wireless press conference.

Features 
Notable changes from its predecessor include multiple hardware refreshes including CPU, GPU, RAM, display resolution and camera. Software features exclusive to Motorola branded smartphones are also included.

References 

Android (operating system) devices
Motorola mobile phones
Mobile phones introduced in 2013
Discontinued smartphones